Giovanni Colombo (6 December 1902 – 20 May 1992) was an Italian Cardinal of the Roman Catholic Church. He served as Archbishop of Milan from 1963 to 1979 and was elevated to the rank of cardinal in 1965.

Biography

Early life and priesthood
Giovanni Colombo was born in Caronno Pertusella, Lombardy, the sixth of the seven children of Enrico and Luigia (née Millefanti) Colombo. His mother worked as a shirt-maker and embroiderer. Colombo was baptized two days after his birth, on 8 December.

Initially studying with the Sisters of the Immaculate Conception in Ivrea, he then attended seminaries in Seveso, Monza, and Milan (where he obtained a doctorate in theology in 1926), and received a doctorate in letters from the Catholic University of Milan in 1932. Receiving the clerical tonsure on 26 May 1923, Colombo was ordained to the priesthood by Cardinal Eugenio Tosi, OSSCA, on 29 May 1926 in the Cathedral of Milan. He was made Professor of Letters at the Seveso seminary in October of that same year.

At the seminary in Venegono Inferiore, he served as Professor of Italian (named in October 1931), Professor of Sacred Eloquence (1932–1944), and rector (2 August 1939 – 1953). Professor of Italian language and literature at the Faculties of Education and of Letters and Philosophy of the Catholic University of Sacro Cuore of Milan, 1937–1939. Colombo was raised to the rank of Monsignor on 7 December 1948 and later Rector Major of the Seminaries of Milan on 23 July 1953. On 30 August 1954, he administered Extreme Unction to Ildefonso Schuster, who was beatified in 1991.

Archbishop
On 25 October 1960, Colombo was appointed Auxiliary Bishop of Milan and Titular Bishop of Philippopolis in Arabia. He received his episcopal consecration on the following 7 December from Cardinal Giovanni Battista Montini, with Archbishop Anacleto Cazzaniga and Bishop Giuseppe Schiavini serving as co-consecrators. Sitting on the Conciliar preparatory commissions for seminaries and universities, Colombo attended the Second Vatican Council (1962–1965). After Montini was elected Pope Paul VI, he named Colombo to succeed him as Archbishop of Milan on 10 August 1963. Along with Bernardus Johannes Alfrink, he assisted Achille Liénart in delivering one of the closing messages of the council on 8 December 1965.

On 6 January 1965, he presided at the ceremonies marking the completion of the construction of the Milan Cathedral, begun in 1397, by blessing the last of its five bronze doors and celebrating Mass.

Cardinal and death
He was created Cardinal-Priest of Ss. Silvestro e Martino ai Monti by Pope Paul VI in the consistory of 22 February 1965, and was one of the cardinal electors who participated in the conclaves of August and October 1978. In the latter conclave, although ill, he obtained many votes as a compromise candidate between Giuseppe Siri and Giovanni Benelli, but he stated that he would decline the papacy in the event of his election. He retired as archbishop of Milan on 29 December 1979.

Colombo died in Milan, at age 89. He is buried under the pavement of the right side nave in front of the altar that contains the remains of Blessed Cardinal Schuster in the Milan Cathedral.

References

External links
Cardinals of the Holy Roman Church
Catholic-Hierarchy

1902 births
1992 deaths
People from Caronno Pertusella
Università Cattolica del Sacro Cuore alumni
20th-century Italian cardinals
Archbishops of Milan
20th-century Italian Roman Catholic archbishops
Participants in the Second Vatican Council
Burials at Milan Cathedral
Cardinals created by Pope Paul VI